Namgung is an East Asian surname that sees varying levels of use in Vietnam, China, Japan, and Korea.

Regardless of country, Namgung is considered to be an uncommon surname, as only a small number of people have the surname.

Mainland China
In Mainland China, the surname Nangong appears in the Song dynasty book Hundred Family Surnames. According to a statistical analysis released by the National Bureau of Statistics of China in 2014, Nangong is estimated to be the surname for 13,000 people in China in 2010.

Hong Kong
In Hong Kong, Namgung is a surname that is often associated with the "Mailbox of Madame Namgung", a Dear Abby-style advice column in the 1950s and 1960s that often dispenses tips and advises related to Human sexuality.

Japan
In Japan, the surname Nangū is estimated to be the surname of about 200 people, with half of them concentrated in the Hyōgo Prefecture, Osaka Prefecture, and Tokyo.

Korea
In Korea, there are historically 6 Namgung Bon-gwan clans, including Hamyeol, Puyun, Nampyong, Ryongan, Uiryeong, and Chasan.

Ancient Korean literatures have noted that the ancestors of the Hamyeol Namgung clan hail from Nangong Kuo, a key adviser in King Wen of Zhou's court.

In South Korea, statistics from 2000 indicate the Hamyeol Namgung clan has 18,703 members.

Notable people
People with this surname include:

Mainland China
Nangong Kuo, a disciple of Confucius.
Nangong Kuo (Western Zhou), Zhou dynasty political figure.
Nangong Wan, a general of the Song State during the Warring States period.

Hong Kong/Taiwan
Naamgung Bok, novelist.

Korea
Namgung Woncheng, Goryeo general that is noted to be the ancestor of the Hamyeol Namgung clan.
Namgung Shin, Goryeo military officer.
Namkoong Won (born 1934), stage name of South Korean actor Hong Gyeong-il.
Namkung Do (born 1982), South Korean football player.
Namkoong Min (born 1978), South Korean actor.
Namkung Woong (born 1984), South Korean football player.

Fictional
 Namgoong Minsu: a character in the movie Snowpiercer portrayed by Song Kang-ho.
 Namgoong Hyeonja [남궁 현자]: fictional architect in the film Parasite, by Bong Joon-ho

References

Korean-language surnames of Chinese origin
Chinese-language surnames
Compound surnames
Individual Chinese surnames
Cantonese-language surnames